Signatech, formerly known as Signature, is a French auto racing team  and racing car constructor that competes in the FIA World Endurance Championship.

The team won the FIA European Formula Three Cup in 1999 with Benoît Tréluyer. It won the French Formula Three Championship in 2000 with Jonathan Cochet as driver, who also won the European Cup and Masters of Formula 3 that year, and won the Korea Super Prix for the team in 2001. In 2002, Renaud Derlot won the European F3 Cup for the team.

In 2003, Signature won the team championship in the first Formula Renault V6 Eurocup, with Tristan Gommendy and Kosuke Matsuura as drivers. They moved from the defunct French F3 series to its replacement, the Formula 3 Euro Series, and Nicolas Lapierre and Fabio Carbone completed a 1–2 finish for the team at the prestigious Macau Grand Prix. Edoardo Mortara and Jean-Karl Vernay repeated this feat in 2009. The team began competing in the 2009 European Le Mans Series in the LMP1 category.

The 2010 season was an outstanding one for Signature in the F3 Euroseries with Edoardo Mortara and Marco Wittmann finishing first and second in the series, winning eight races between them, and also taking the team championship.

Signatech provided the chassis for the Formula Future Fiat, a junior formula racing series in Brazil held in 2010 and 2011.

In 2011, in cooperation with the Nissan GT Academy, Signatech finished second in LMP2 at the 24 Hours of Le Mans.

In 2012, Signature decided to pull out of the Formula 3 Euro Series, to concentrate on its involvement in sport car races.

The team finished tenth overall at the 2012 24 Hours of Le Mans using a Nissan-powered Oreca 03.

In 2013, Alpine partnered with Signatech to run an LMP2 car in the European Le Mans Series with French drivers Pierre Ragues and Nelson Panciatici. Signatech won the LMP2 Team's and Driver's championships.

In 2014, Signatech delivered chassis for the Formula 4 Sudamericana.

In 2015, Signatech, continuing its partnership with Alpine, returned to the FIA World Endurance Championship, winning the championship LMP2 category in 2016 and 2018-19. 

In 2020, Signatech returned to the European Le Mans Series under the name of Richard Mille Racing Team. The team previously planned to run an all-female lineup of Tatiana Calderón, Katherine Legge and Sophia Flörsch, however, due to Legge's injury, she was then replaced by André Negrão for the first two rounds. Beitske Visser would then take over Legge's place for the rest of the season. The team would then join the LMP2 class of the 2021 FIA World Endurance Championship, with an all-female lineup of Tatiana Calderón, Beitske Visser and Sophia Flörsch.

In 2021, the team partnered again with Alpine, this time fielding a "grandfathered" Rebellion R13 in the Le Mans Hypercar class for the 2021 FIA World Endurance Championship season, which finished third overall at the 2021 24 Hours of Le Mans.

Timeline

References

External links

 

}

French auto racing teams
French racecar constructors
Auto racing teams established in 1990
1990 establishments in France
Formula 3 Euro Series teams
FIA World Endurance Championship teams
24 Hours of Le Mans teams
European Le Mans Series teams
FIA Formula 3 European Championship teams
French Formula 3 teams
British Formula Three teams
Renault in motorsport